Avdotyino is a rural locality (a village) in Kashinskoye Rural Settlement of Volokolamsky District, Moscow Oblast, Russia. The population was 9 as of 2010.

Geography 
Avdotyino is located 8 km northeast of Volokolamsk (the district's administrative centre) by road. Golubtsovo is the nearest rural locality.

References 

Rural localities in Moscow Oblast